Polyscytalum pustulans is an ascomycete fungus that is a plant pathogen infecting potatoes.

References

External links 
 Index Fungorum
 USDA ARS Fungal Database

Fungal plant pathogens and diseases
Potato diseases
Ascomycota enigmatic taxa